The Homolobinae are a subfamily of braconid parasitoid wasps. The subfamily Charmontinae was previously included within Homolobinae as the tribe Charmontini.

Description and distribution 
Homolobines are relatively large braconids, often resembling species of Macrocentrinae. They have non-cyclostome mouth parts. Many are pale in coloration with large eyes and long tibial spurs on the hind leg. They can be separated from macrocentrines by the presence of an occipital carinae, which is a ridge along the back of the head.

Biology  
Homolobines are koinobiont endoparasitoids of caterpillars. Females lay a single egg on each host. Most recorded hosts are in the families Noctuidae and Geometridae. Most species of Homolobinae are nocturnal.

References

External links 
 Photos on BugGuide
 DNA barcodes at BOLD systems

Braconidae
Apocrita subfamilies